The Keuffel and Esser Co., also known as K & E, was a drafting instrument and supplies company founded in 1867 by two German immigrants, William J. D. Keuffel and Herman Esser. It was the first American company to specialize in these products.

Keuffel and Esser was acquired by AZON Corp. in 1987.

History 
Keuffel and Esser started in New York, selling drawing materials and drafting supplies. In 1876, K & E started selling surveying instruments. The four-story Keuffel and Esser Manufacturing Complex in Hoboken, New Jersey, was completed four years later. K & E was incorporated in 1889. In 1892, the company commissioned the architecture firm of De Lomos & Cordes to build a showroom and offices at 127 Fulton Street in Manhattan. The firm designed an eight-story brick and terra cotta building in the Renaissance Revival style. The building was completed in 1893, and the company occupied it until 1961. It was designated a New York City landmark in 2005.

In the first decade of the 20th century, Keuffel and Esser introduced a new line of surveying instruments based on the work of John Paoli, an Italian immigrant in Hoboken. A new Keuffel and Esser Manufacturing Complex was built in 1906. The building was converted to housing in 1975 and was added to the National Register of Historic Places on September 12, 1985.

The Leroy K & E Controlled Lettering System uses a pantograph for mechanical technical lettering.

K & E acquired Young & Sons of Philadelphia in 1918 and made it a department of the firm.

In 1891, K & E started manufacturing slide rules. The company produced the 4139 Cooke Radio Slide Rule, designed in the mid-1930s by Nelson M. Cooke, of the Navy's Radio Materiel School, thousands of which were made. The K & E 4081-3 Log-Log Duplex Decitrig was a mainstay for engineering students and practicing engineers in the 1940s, 50s, and 60s. During World War II, the company made fire-control instruments for the US government and won seven Army-Navy "E" Awards for Excellence in Production.

With the advent of the electronic, transistorized calculator in the 1970s, slide rules became obsolete for most uses. Slide rules had never been very profitable for K & E, so it was not difficult to discontinue the line. K & E's market share shrank because of other technological advancements, and the firm shut down its slide-rule engraving machines in 1975.

In the 1960s, K & E had an office in Montreal, Quebec, at 130 Montée de Liesse. It was one of the main suppliers to major engineering firms in Québec during the thriving years of the late sixties, when the province was booming with construction activities, building highways and preparing for Expo 67.

In 1984, three years prior to Azon's acquisition of K&E, Rowley-Scher Reprographics, Inc. (a company then based in Washington, DC) acquired K&E's reprographics businesses in Arlington and Fairfax, VA and in Norfolk, VA. Keuffel and Esser was acquired by AZON Corp. in 1987.

References
Notes

External links
Information about Keuffel and Esser from National Museum of American History
K & E Slide Rule Model Archive - Sphere Research Corp.
Guide to the Leroy Lettering Set Manufactured by Keuffel & Esser 1970

Companies based in Hudson County, New Jersey
Hoboken, New Jersey
German-American culture in New Jersey
Tool manufacturing companies of the United States
1867 establishments in New York (state)
1987 disestablishments in New Jersey
Design companies established in 1867
Manufacturing companies established in 1867
Manufacturing companies disestablished in 1987
Defunct manufacturing companies based in New Jersey